Corrado Ardizzoni (23 February 1916 – 14 March 1980) was an Italian cyclist. He competed in the individual and team road race events at the 1936 Summer Olympics.

References

External links
 

1916 births
1980 deaths
Italian male cyclists
Olympic cyclists of Italy
Cyclists at the 1936 Summer Olympics
Sportspeople from the Province of Ferrara
Cyclists from Emilia-Romagna